George Willi III (May 1, 1924 – September 26, 2016) was a judge of the United States Court of Claims from 1965 to 1982, and of the United States Court of Federal Claims from 1982 to 1985.

Born in New York, New York, Willi served in the U.S. Army Air Forces during World War II, from 1943 to 1946, achieving the rank of captain. He then received a Bachelor of Business Administration from the University of Wisconsin in 1950 and a Bachelor of Laws from the University of Wisconsin Law School the same year. He was a Carriers' attorney for the National Railroad Adjustment Board from  1950 to 1951, and a trial attorney in the Tax Division of the U.S. Department of Justice from 1951 to 1963, thereafter entering private practice in Washington, D.C., in 1964.

In 1965, Willi became a trial judge of the U.S. Court of Claims. On October 1, 1982, Willi was appointed by operation of the Federal Courts Improvement Act, 96 Stat. 27, to a new seat on the United States Court of Claims. In 2003, Judge Alex Kozinski wrote in an article on his tenure as Chief Judge of the Court of Claims:

Willi assumed senior status on December 14, 1982, and then resigned from the court entirely on January 4, 1985. Willi was one of several judges originally assigned to the U.S. Court of Federal Claims for whom no successor was appointed.

References

External links 

1924 births
2016 deaths
Lawyers from New York City
United States Army Air Forces personnel of World War II
Judges of the United States Court of Federal Claims
Wisconsin School of Business alumni
University of Wisconsin Law School alumni
20th-century American judges
20th-century American lawyers